The True Jacob is a 1960 West German comedy film directed by Rudolf Schündler and starring Willy Millowitsch, Renate Ewert and Jane Tilden. It is a remake of a German film from 1931.

Cast
 Willy Millowitsch as Peter Struwe
 Renate Ewert as Yvette
 Jane Tilden as Frau Struwe
 Astrid Frank as Lotte Struwe
 Hans von Borsody as Fred
 Hans Leibelt as Eduard Struwe
 Hans Olden as Von Schöberl
 Gunnar Möller as Jimmy
 Lotti Krekel as Lisa
 Franz Schneider as Böcklein
 Marlene Warrlich
 Käte Alving
 Lotti Alberti
 Barbara Daniszewski
 Manfred Schaeffer

See also
 The True Jacob (1931)
 Oh, Daddy! (1935)
 One Night Apart (1950)

References

Bibliography
 Goble, Alan. The Complete Index to Literary Sources in Film. Walter de Gruyter, 1999.

External links 
 

1960 films
1960 comedy films
German comedy films
West German films
1960s German-language films
Films directed by Rudolf Schündler
German films based on plays
Remakes of German films
UFA GmbH films
1960s German films